This article lists fellows of the Royal Society elected in 1968.

Fellows 

Ephraim Saul Anderson
Leslie Clifford Bateman
Donald Eric Broadbent
Geoffrey Ronald Burbidge
Benedict Delisle Burns
Richard Clive Cookson
David Parker Craig
Dennis John Crisp
James Dyson
Sir Eric Eastwood
Sir George Robert Edwards
Trevor Walworth Goodwin
Sir Henry Harris
Robert Neville Haszeldine
Antony Hewish
Ioan Mackenzie James
Douglas Samuel Jones
Anthony David Lees
Patrick Loudon Mollison
Donald Henry Northcote
Phillip Sadler Nutman
Donald William Pashley
Owen Martin Phillips
David Rees
Frederick Denys Richardson
Sir Michael George Parke Stoker
John Crossley Swallow
Sir George Taylor
Richard Gilbert West
David Theodore Nelson Williamson
John Tuzo Wilson
Sir Michael Francis Addison Woodruff

Foreign members 

Edoardo Amaldi
Adolf Friedrich Johann Butenandt
Kurt Gödel
Jacques Lucien Monod

Statute 12 fellows 

Éamon de Valera
Sir Robert Eric Mortimer Wheeler

References

1968
1968 in science
1968 in the United Kingdom